Anne Ormrod (born 17 August 1987) is a former association football player who represented New Zealand at international level.

Ormrod made her Football Ferns début in a 0–5 loss to United States on 3 October 2004, and made just one further appearance, in a 0–6 loss also to United States, a week later.

References

1987 births
Living people
New Zealand women's association footballers
New Zealand women's international footballers
Women's association footballers not categorized by position